"Two Way Street" is a song performed and co-written by New Zealand recording artist Kimbra, issued as the fifth single from her debut album Vows.

Critical reception
The song has received mainly positive reviews from critics. Many critics stated that the song is "better than her song with Gotye", with writer Jens Ulvedahl Carlsen giving the song a B rating.

Live performances
Kimbra performed the song, along with the rest of the album, at Sing Sing Studios in Melbourne, Australia on 28 September 2010, two years before the song's official release. She went on to perform the song on Triple J  and at the Billboard Tastemakers LIVE concert series.

Music video

The official music video was directed by Matthew Rolston.

Chart positions

References

External links
 
 

2011 songs
2012 singles
Kimbra songs
Music videos directed by Matthew Rolston
Song recordings produced by François Tétaz
Songs written by Kimbra
Songs written by François Tétaz
Warner Records singles